Stella Peter Kingsley (born 13 November 2002) is a Nigerian weightlifter. She represented Nigeria at the 2019 African Games held in Rabat, Morocco and she won the silver medal in the women's 45kg event. She also represented Nigeria at the 2022 Commonwealth Games held in Birmingham, England.

Career 

Kingsley won the gold medal in the women's 49kg event at the 2021 African Weightlifting Championships held in Nairobi, Kenya. She also competed in the women's 49kg event at the 2021 World Weightlifting Championships held in Tashkent, Uzbekistan. She finished in 5th place in this competition. The 2021 Commonwealth Weightlifting Championships were also held at the same time and her total result gave her the gold medal in this event. As a result, she qualified to compete at the 2022 Commonwealth Games in Birmingham, England.

Kingsley finished in 4th place in the women's 49 kg event at the 2022 Commonwealth Games.

Achievements

References

External links 
 

Living people
2002 births
Nigerian female weightlifters
African Games medalists in weightlifting
African Games silver medalists for Nigeria
Competitors at the 2019 African Games
African Weightlifting Championships medalists
Weightlifters at the 2022 Commonwealth Games
Commonwealth Games competitors for Nigeria
21st-century Nigerian women